The 2011–12 Greek Football Cup was the 70th edition of the Greek Football Cup. A total of 57 clubs, ten less than in the last edition, were accepted to enter. The competition commenced on 9 November 2011 with the first round and concluded in April 2012 with the final between Olympiacos and Atromitos, with Olympiacos winning 2–1 after extra time. The delay of the start of the tournament was due to judicial decisions after the Koriopolis scandal.

Teams

Calendar

Participating clubs
The following 57 teams competed in the first round: (Teams in bold are still active in the competition)

Knockout phase
Each tie in the knockout phase, apart from the quarter-finals and the semi-finals, was played by a single match. If the score was level at the end of normal time, extra time was played, followed by a penalty shoot-out if the score was still level. In the quarter-finals and the semi-finals were played over two legs, with each team playing one leg at home. The team that scored more goals on aggregate over the two legs advanced to the next round. If the aggregate score was level, the away goals rule was applied, i.e. the team that scored more goals away from home over the two legs advanced. If away goals were also equal, then extra time was played. The away goals rule was again applied after extra time, i.e. if there were goals scored during extra time and the aggregate score was still level, the visiting team advanced by virtue of more away goals scored. If no goals were scored during extra time, the winners were decided by a penalty shoot-out. In the round of 16, if the score was level at the end of normal time the two-legged rule was applied.The mechanism of the draws for each round is as follows:
In the draw for the second round, the teams from the second division are seeded and the winners from the first round were unseeded. The seeded teams are drawn against the unseeded teams.

In the draw for the Round of 32, the teams from the first division are seeded and the winners from the second round were unseeded. The seeded teams are drawn against the unseeded teams.

In the draws for the Round of 16 onwards, there are no seedings and teams from the different group can be drawn against each other.

First round
The draw for this round took place on 2 November 2011.

Summary

|-
|colspan="3" style="background-color:#D0D0D0" align=center|9 November 2011

|-
|colspan="3" style="background-color:#D0D0D0" align=center|13 November 2011

|-
|colspan="3" style="background-color:#D0D0D0" align=center|N/A

|}

Matches

Second round
The draw for took place on 10 November 2011.

Summary

|-
|colspan="3" style="background-color:#D0D0D0" align=center|22 November 2011

|-
|colspan="3" style="background-color:#D0D0D0" align=center|23 November 2011

|-
|colspan="3" style="background-color:#D0D0D0" align=center|24 November 2011

|}

Matches

Additional round
The draw for took place on 10 November 2011.

Summary

|-
|colspan="3" style="background-color:#D0D0D0" align=center|7 December 2011

|}

Matches

Bracket

Round of 32
The draw for took place on 10 November 2011.

Summary

|}

Matches

The match had been suspended in the 15th minute after an assistant referee had been hit by a seat thrown from the stands of Ethnikos Asteras' fans, while the score was at 0–0. With 29 December 2011 decision, the match was awarded to PAOK.

Round of 16
The draw for this round took place on 23 December 2011.

Summary

|}

Matches

Quarter-finals
The draw took place on 18 January 2012.

Summary

|}

Matches

Semi-finals
The draw took place on 18 January 2012, after the quarter-final draw.

Summary

|}

Matches

Atromitos won on away goals.

Olympiacos won 1–0 on aggregate.

Final

Top scorers

6 goals
 Marko Pantelić (Olympiacos)

3 goals

 Rubén Rayos (Asteras Tripolis)
 Filipe da Costa (Panserraikos)
 Ilias Solakis (Asteras Tripolis)

2 goals

 Djamel Abdoun (Olympiacos)
 Brito (Atromitos)
 Dimitris Diamantis (Apollon Athens)
 Sokratis Fytanidis (Atromitos)
 Giannis Gesios (Anagennisi Epanomi)
 Thanasis Karagounis (Atromitos)
 Lino (PAOK)
 Vangelis Platellas (Kallithea)
 Nikos Soultanidis (Panthrakikos)
 Kostas Tsoupros (Asteras Magoula)

1 goal

 Kostas Albanis (Tilikratis)
 Nemanja Arsenijević (Asteras Tripolis)
 Stefanos Athanasiadis (PAOK)
 Balú (Panthrakikos)
 Giorgos Barkoglou (Kerkyra)
 Steve Leo Beleck (AEK Athens)
 Christos Bourbos (OFI)
 Mário Breška (Asteras Tripolis)
 Nery Castillo (Aris)
 Gerasimos Chaikalis (Ethnikos Asteras)
 Giorgos Chorianopoulos (Ethnikos Asteras)
 Edin Cocalić (Panionios)
 Héctor Luis Cuevas (PAS Giannina)
 Thanasis Dinas (Panachaiki 2005)
 Diogo (Olympiacos)
 Christos Eleftheriadis (Paniliakos)
 Vasilis Floros (Oikonomos Tsaritsani)
 David Fuster (Olympiacos)
 Dimitris Gaidartzis (Doxa Kranoula)
 Fotis Georgiou (PAS Giannina)
 Vangelis Georgiou (Anagennisi Epanomi)
 Dimitris Giantsis (Kerkyra)
 Sakis Gogas (Tilikratis)
 Dimitris Gourtsas (Panserraikos)
 Gustavo (Kerkyra)
 Nikos Iordanidis (Aetos Skydra)
 Juli (Asteras Tripolis)
 Nikos Kaltsas (Kallithea)
 Nikos Kaltsas (Veria)
 Vlasis Kazakis (Skoda Xanthi)
 Panagiotis Karachalios (Glyfada)
 Michalis Karagiannis (Aetos Skydra)
 Kydon Karlopoulos (Thrasyvoulos)
 Fotis Kiskabanis (Apollon Athens)
 Petros Konteon (Pierikos)
 Nikos Korovesis (Apollon Athens)
 Michalis Kripintiris (Kalloni)
 Pantelis Krystallis (Paniliakos)
 Pavlos Kyriakidis (Paniliakos)
 Leonidas Kyvelidis (Panachaiki 2005)
 Leozinho (Kalloni)
 Michalis Manias (PAO Rouf)
 Giorgos Manousos (Kalloni)
 Vangelis Mantzios (OFI)
 Marcelinho (Skoda Xanthi)
 Mathios Maroukakis (Kallithea)
 Goran Maznov (Kerkyra)
 Olof Mellberg (Olympiacos)
 Michel (Aris)
 Kostas Mitroglou (Atromitos)
 Lazaros Mouratidis (Pontioi Katerini)
 Blendi Moutsa (Oikonomos Tsaritsani)
 Alexis Nikoulis (Oikonomos Tsaritsani)
 Fotios Papoulis (OFI)
 Dimitris Pliagas (AEL)
 Nikos Pourtoulidis (Pierikos)
 André Guerreiro Rocha (Panetolikos)
 Argyris Samios (Proodeftiki)
 Andre Schembri (Panionios)
 Stelios Serepas (Asteras Magoula)
 Dimitris Siovas (Panionios)
 Mirnes Šišić (OFI)
 Karim Soltani (Aris)
 Dennis Souza (OFI)
 Ilias Stavrou (Kallithea)
 Stathis Stefanidis (Agrotikos Asteras)
 Christopher Sullivan (Apollon Kalamarias)
 Božidar Tadić (Veria)
 Tássio (Anagennisi Epanomi)
 Efstathios Tavlaridis (OFI)
 Savvas Tsabouris (Asteras Tripolis)
 Michalis Tsamourlidis (Glyfada)
 Athanasios Tsigas (Kerkyra)
 Stavros Tziortziopoulos (Kalloni)
 Theodoros Vasilakakis (Skoda Xanthi)
 Loukas Vyntra (Panathinaikos)
 Panagiotis Zorbas (OFI)

Own goals
 Giorgos Kokkinis (Panachaiki 2005, playing against Doxa Kranoula)
 Christos Arkoudas (Kallithea, playing against Doxa Drama)

References

External links
 Greek Cup 2011-2012 at Hellenic Football Federation's official site

Greek Football Cup seasons
Cup
Greek Cup